The following graphs presents the officer ranks of the Indian Navy. These ranks generally correspond with those of Western militaries, and reflect those of the British military ranks.

Officer ranks 

While the provision for the rank of Admiral of the Fleet exists, it is primarily intended for major wartime use and honour. No officer of the Indian Navy has yet been conferred this rank. Both the Army and Air Force have had officers who have been conferred with the equivalent rank – Field Marshals Sam Manekshaw and K. M. Cariappa of the Army and Marshal of the Indian Air Force Arjan Singh.

The highest ranked naval officer is the Chief of Naval Staff, who holds the rank of full Admiral.

They are commissioned Sub-lieutenants upon finishing their course of study. The Medical Officers and Dental Officers use the prefix "Surgeon" with all the respective ranks, for example Surgeon Vice Admiral.

Other ranks 
Chief Petty Officer was the highest non-commissioned rank until December 1968, when the ranks of Master Chief Petty Officer Class II and Master Chief Petty Officer Class I were introduced.

See also 
 Comparative military ranks
 Army ranks and insignia of India
 Air Force ranks and insignia of India
 Coast Guard ranks and insignia of India
 Border Roads Organisation ranks and insignia of India
 Paramilitary forces ranks and insignia of India
 Police ranks and insignia of India

Notes 
 1 Honorary/Ceremonial/wartime rank. Has never been awarded.
 2 Held by the Chief of the Naval Staff or the Chief of Defence Staff.

References

External links 
Uniforminsignia.org (Indian Navy)

Indian Navy
Military ranks of India
India Navy